Clive Seale (born 1955) is a British sociologist. He is Professor of Sociology at Brunel University. Until 2012, he was Professor of Medical Sociology in the Institute of Health Sciences Education at Queen Mary, University of London, England.

Overview
Seale was educated at Bryanston School in Dorset. He then studied for BEd, MSc, and PhD degrees at the University of Southampton, Royal Holloway, University of London and from the UK Council for National Academic Awards (CNAA). He has been a professor at Goldsmiths College in east London (until 2003), Queen Mary, University of London (2008–12), and Brunel University in west London (2003–8, 2012 onwards).

Seale does research into communication in health care settings, end-of-life care, mass media and health, and social research methods.
He is Managing Editor of the journal Sociology of Health and Illness.

End of life decision making
Clive Seale's research has investigated the prevalence of euthanasia and assisted suicide in the UK. Although some members of the public were surprised at the number of accelerated deaths and cases of continuous deep sedation in the UK, the rate is lower than in many other countries. He has found that UK doctors are more likely to have an open discussion about decisions which may hasten patient's death than in other countries. His research into attitudes towards euthanasia has found doctors to be less in favour of legalising euthanasia or forms of assisted dying than the general public.

He has also investigated the role of religion in end of life decision making, finding that a doctor's faith influences whether they are likely to take decisions which hasten death, and whether they discuss making such decisions with their patients. Non-religious doctors were more likely to take medical decisions which may have hastened death than religious ones, however when religious doctors took such decisions they were less likely to have discussed them with their patients first. It appears therefore that doctor's religious values are strongly linked to ethically controversial decision making, against the advice of the British Medical Association, which instructs doctors to not to let their religious views interfere with treatment of patients.

Publications
Clive Seale has authored many research papers and books.
His books include:

 Seale, C. (1998). Constructing Death: The Sociology of Dying and Bereavement. Cambridge University Press.  (hardback).  (paperback).
 Seale, C. (1999). The Quality of Qualitative Research. SAGE Publications.  (hardback).
 Seale, C. (2001). Medical Knowledge, 2nd edition. Open University Press.  (paperback).
 Davey, B., Gray, A., Seale, C. (2002). Health and Disease: A Reader, 3rd edition. Open University Press.  (hardback).  (paperback).
 Seale, C. (2003).  Media and Health. SAGE Publications.  (hardcover).
 Seale, C. (ed.) (2003). Social Research Methods: A Reader. Routledge.  (hardback).  (paperback).
 Seale, C. (ed.) (2004). Researching Society and Culture, SAGE Publications. (Second edition.)  (hardback).  (paperback).
 Seale, C., Gobo, G., Gubrium, J., and Silverman, D. (eds.) (2006). Qualitative Research Practice. SAGE Publications.  (paperback).

References

External links
 Clive Seal home page

1955 births
Living people
People educated at Bryanston School
Alumni of the University of Southampton
Alumni of Royal Holloway, University of London
British sociologists
Medical sociologists
Academic journal editors
Academics of Goldsmiths, University of London
Academics of Queen Mary University of London
Academics of Brunel University London